The 2022–23 Minnesota Golden Gophers men's basketball team represented the University of Minnesota in the 2022–23 NCAA Division I men's basketball season. The Gophers were led by second-year head coach Ben Johnson and played their home games at Williams Arena in Minneapolis, Minnesota as members of the Big Ten Conference. They finished the season 9–22, 2–17 in Big Ten play to finish in last place. They defeated Nebraska in the first round of the Big Ten tournament before losing to Maryland.

Previous season
The Gophers finished the 2021–22 season 13–17, 4–16 in Big Ten play to finish in a tie for last place. The team was almost entirely remade from the prior season, with 10 players transferring out of the program following the firing of former head coach Richard Pitino.

The Gophers began the season well, compiling a 10–1 record to begin the season, including the team's first road win against Michigan in Ann Arbor since 2011. The Gophers were unable to continue that success as the season wore on, losing 16 of their final 19 games and finishing the season with a 60–51 loss to Penn State in the first round of the Big Ten tournament.

Offseason

Departures

Incoming transfers

Recruiting classes

2022 recruiting class

2023 Recruiting class

Roster

Schedule and results

|-
!colspan=9 style=| Exhibition

|-
! colspan="9" style=|Regular season

|-
! colspan="9" style=|Big Ten tournament

References

External links

2022–23
Minnesota
2022 in sports in Minnesota